Foreign relations exist between Australia and Germany. Both nations are members of the G-20 major economies, Organisation for Economic Co-operation and Development and the United Nations.

History

New Guinea

An early collision of Australian and German interests dates to the early 1880s, as both the German Empire and the elites of the United Kingdom's Australian colonies were interested in exploiting the resources of the island of New Guinea. Eventually, the north-eastern quarter of the island became a German protectorate in 1884 (German New Guinea), while Queensland annexed the southeastern quarter of the island to the British Empire in 1883. In 1902–1905, soon after the formation of the Commonwealth of Australia, this Territory of Papua was formally transferred under the Australian administration. Thus a land border between German and Australian colonial possessions came into existence, at least as a line on world maps. In practice, however, there was little if any colonial presence in the interior of the island, and the border remained mostly unsurveyed.

The two wars 

As a member of the British Empire, Australia found itself at war with Germany in both World War I (1914-1918) and World War II (1939-1945). Although the two countries are widely geographically separated, both wars involved some direct encounters between the two countries' militaries. 
Although Australians' best-remembered operation in World War I, the Gallipoli Campaign, was fought against the Ottoman Empire, 
many Australian units faced Germans on the Western Front, while the small Australian Naval and Military Expeditionary Force fought Germans in the Pacific.

At the conclusion of the war, an Australian delegation participated in the negotiating of the Treaty of Versailles, codifying the partitioning of the former German Empire among the winners. The Treaty of Versailles became the first international treaty signed by Australian representatives. Australian Prime Minister Billy Hughes forcibly pressed for high German reparations payments and Article 231 assigning it guilt for the conflict so that the British Empire and Dominions could benefit from the payments, despite opposition from the United States. Pursuant to the treaty, the former German New Guinea became Territory of New Guinea, administered by Australia under a League of Nations mandate. The remote isolated island of Nauru, which formerly had been administratively part of 
the German New Guinea, became a separate mandate territory - theoretically, under jointly administration of Australia, New Zealand, and the United Kingdom, but de facto run primarily by Australians.

In World War II, Australia was one of the first countries to declare war on Germany, on 3 September 1939, the third day of the German invasion of Poland. The Battle between HMAS Sydney and German auxiliary cruiser Kormoran in November 1941 resulted in the sinking of both ships; the Western Desert Campaign, including the Siege of Tobruk was an important land campaign with major German and Australian participation.

During both wars, German enemy aliens found in Australia at the outbreak of the war, were interned. Internee and PoW camps throughout Australia also housed a number of German sailors (from both the merchant marine and the navy), as well as German prisoners of wars brought from other theaters (primarily, north Africa).

Diplomatic history
The German Empire opened a consulate in Sydney in the late 19th century. The German consul, Carl Ludwig Sahl (1840-1897), who spent most of his life in the South Pacific region, received his acceptance by British authorities on October 18, 1872; he served in Sydney until his death in 1897, and was buried there.

After the First World War, the first consul of the Weimar Republic, Dr Hans Büsing, arrived to Australia in 1924.

Diplomatic relations between Australia and the Federal Republic of Germany started soon after the creation of the latter. In 1949, an Australian mission was established in Bonn, accredited to the Allied High Commission (the occupation government). In 1952, the mission was converted to an Australian embassy accredited to the FRG government. Diplomatic relations with the German Democratic Republic were established by the Whitlam government in 1973 (see below for more).

Relations with the GDR
For about 37 years after the collapse of Nazi Germany, the Australian government refused to recognise East Germany or accept East German passports, due to ideological and political reasons; Australia viewing the GDR as a satellite state aligned and heavily influenced by the Soviet Union, while the GDR viewed Australia as a product of British colonialism, intent on destroying Marxism–Leninism. There were small trade relations and low-level visits though, which went unnoticed by the governments.

It wasn't until 1972, when, after a Labor victory led by Gough Whitlam, the government then considered recognition of the GDR. After some negotiations between the two governments, the Australian government finally recognised the GDR the following year. An embassy was built in the "diplomatic quarter" of East Berlin at Grabbeallee 34. Following German reunification in 1990, the embassy (along with the other one in Bonn) was closed.

European Union 

Germany was a founding member of the European Union (EU). The EU and Australia have solid relations and increasingly see eye-to-eye on international issues. The EU-Australian relations are founded on a Partnership Framework, first agreed in 2008. It covers not just economic relations, but broader political issues and cooperation.

Trade 
Trade between the two countries is sizable but heavily weighted to imports from Germany. In 2008, total two-way merchandise trade was valued at over A$13.4 billion, of which A$11.4 billion (85 per cent) were imports from Germany.

Treaties 
A significant number of Australia–Germany bilateral treaties include agreements on trade, science, space, taxation/social security, extradition, and other matters.

Resident diplomatic missions
 Australia has an embassy in Berlin and a consulate-general in Frankfurt.
 Germany has an embassy in Canberra and a consulate-general in Sydney.

See also 
 Foreign relations of Germany
 Foreign relations of Australia
 German Australian

References

 

 
Bilateral relations of Germany 
Germany